Stanley Peter Belinda (born August 6, 1966) is a former Major League Baseball player. He pitched from a three-quarters arm slot (sometimes categorized as a "sidearm" delivery) and threw both a regular low-90s fastball and a split-fingered fastball.

Baseball career

Pittsburgh Pirates
As an amateur, Belinda pitched at State College Area High School and Allegany College of Maryland. In , the Pittsburgh Pirates selected him in the 10th round of the June draft, the 238th pick overall. He made his professional debut in the Gulf Coast League and advanced steadily through the minors, making his major league debut with the Pirates on September 8, 1989. From –, Belinda was a key reliever for the Pirates, setting up for Bill Landrum in the first two years before being promoted to closer in 1992.

1992 National League Championship Series
The Pirates were one of the dominant teams in the National League at that time, winning the East division three consecutive years from 1990 to 1992, but they ultimately proved unable to advance to the World Series. In Game 7 of the NLCS, Belinda came out of the bullpen in the ninth inning, trying to protect a 2–0 Pittsburgh lead with three men on base and nobody out. Belinda induced Ron Gant to fly out, scoring one run, then walked Damon Berryhill and retired Brian Hunter on a popup. Then, with reserve Francisco Cabrera at the plate, Belinda surrendered a game-winning single, with slow-footed Sid Bream barely beating the throw from left fielder Barry Bonds to score the winning run from second base.

Kansas City Royals and Boston Red Sox
Belinda was the subject of intense criticism in Pittsburgh after the loss, although his overall performance in the playoffs had been very good, and the loss of Bonds in free agency that offseason ended the team's days as a contender. The Pirates entered a rebuilding mode, and on July 31, 1993, they traded Belinda to the Kansas City Royals for pitchers Jon Lieber and Dan Miceli. While with the Royals, Belinda pulled off an immaculate inning, striking out the side on nine pitches.  He is the last Royals pitcher to achieve this feat.  Arm problems plagued Belinda during his year and a half with the Royals, and he left the team as a free agent, signing with the Boston Red Sox shortly before the 1995 season.

Temporarily healthy once more, Belinda enjoyed a great season in 1995, picking up eight wins and 10 saves as the primary setup man for Rick Aguilera. Boston won the American League's East division that year, but was swept in three games by the Cleveland Indians in the ALDS.

Cincinnati Reds
Belinda signed with the Cincinnati Reds that offseason, and improbably went on to enjoy the best season of his career, delivering 99 innings of quality pitching. His 84 games pitched ranked second in the league, and his 114 strikeouts led all relief pitchers in baseball. He began to experience tingling and numbness in his legs the following season, and on September 22, 1998, the Mayo Clinic issued a diagnosis of multiple sclerosis.

Colorado Rockies and Atlanta Braves
Daily injections of the drug Copaxone and changes to his diet and lifestyle enabled Belinda to keep pitching professionally for a time, but his performance suffered. He spent  as a mop-up pitcher for the Reds, and on October 30 of that year, he and outfielder Jeffrey Hammonds were traded to the Colorado Rockies for outfielder Dante Bichette. He signed with the Atlanta Braves but was released again on September 12, ending his professional career. He retired with 41 wins, 37 losses, and 79 saves, putting up a 4.15 ERA in 685 career innings.

Personal life 
Belinda has multiple sclerosis. Belinda has a son, Wyatt, who played baseball at the college level. His nephew, Jacob played college baseball at Lock Haven University and currently plays in the Atlanta Braves organization.

References

External links

1966 births
Living people
Major League Baseball pitchers
Pittsburgh Pirates players
Kansas City Royals players
Boston Red Sox players
Cincinnati Reds players
Colorado Rockies players
Atlanta Braves players
Baseball players from Pennsylvania
Gulf Coast Pirates players
Watertown Pirates players
Macon Pirates players
Salem Buccaneers players
Harrisburg Senators players
Buffalo Bisons (minor league) players
Sarasota Red Sox players
Pawtucket Red Sox players
Indianapolis Indians players
Allegany Trojans baseball players
People with multiple sclerosis